Shakespeare's Way is a waymarked long-distance footpath in southern England, United Kingdom.

The route

The 235 km (146 mi) waymarked route (which opened in 2006) runs from William Shakespeare's birthplace in Stratford-upon-Avon in Warwickshire to the modern Shakespeare's Globe (near the site of the original Globe Theatre), on the south bank of the River Thames in London. The Globe replicates a late Elizabethan or early Jacobean theatre of the period.

The route is intended to shadow a possible route taken by Shakespeare himself when journeying between London, where he acted and wrote his plays, and his home in Stratford.

The route passes through part of the Cotswolds, the Chiltern Hills, the valley of the River Stour, Warwickshire, Oxford and enters the Thames Valley at Marlow, Buckinghamshire before following the Grand Union Canal and then the Thames Path into London.

External links
 The Shakespeare's Way website
 BBC Coventry & Warwickshire article on the walk

Long-distance footpaths in England
Footpaths in Warwickshire
Footpaths in Oxfordshire
Footpaths in London
Footpaths in Buckinghamshire